The lesser masked weaver (Ploceus intermedius) is a species of bird in the family Ploceidae. It builds its nests in large colonies, often alongside the village weaver and sometimes the red-billed buffalo weaver. This species is commonly parasitised by the Diederik cuckoo. It is found in eastern, south-eastern and southern Africa.

Taxonomy and systematics
There are two subspecies:
 P. i. intermedius Rüppell, 1845 – From Djibouti to central Tanzania
 P. i. cabanisii (W. K. H. Peters, 1868) – African west coast and southern Africa 
Synonyms are P. i. beattyi in Angola and P. i. luebberti in Namibia

References

External links
 Lesser masked weaver -  Species text in Weaver Watch.
 Lesser masked weaver - Species text in The Atlas of Southern African Birds.

lesser masked weaver
Birds of Sub-Saharan Africa
lesser masked weaver
Birds of East Africa
Taxonomy articles created by Polbot